Kumbhraj is a town in  Guna district in the Indian state of Madhya Pradesh. Kumbhraj is one of the largest producer of coriander seeds in the world. Many multinational companies like Tata procure coriander seeds from Kumbhraj. Kumbhraj name is given by Rana Kumbha.

Demographics
 India census, Kumbhraj had a population of 25,000. Males constitute 52% of the population and females 48%. Kumbhraj has an average literacy rate of 57%, lower than the national average of 59.5%: male literacy is 67%, and female literacy is 45%. In Kumbhraj, 18% of the population is under 6 years of age. Kumbhraj city is famous for coriander.

Geography
Kumbhraj is located at the bank of river Parvati at. It has an average elevation of 419 metres (1,374 feet).

Transportation
Kumbhraj railway station is situated on Indore–Gwalior line under the Bhopal railway division.
The nearest airport is Gwalior.

References

Cities and towns in Guna district